Central Road Research Institute (CRRI) established in 1952 is a constituent laboratory of India's Council of Scientific and Industrial Research (CSIR). The CRRI is located on Mathura road in  Okhla, New Delhi and conducts research and development in the areas of design, construction, maintenance and management of roads and airport runways. It also works in area of traffic and surface transportation planning.

Details 
Central Road Research Institute (CRRI), a premier national laboratory established in 1952, a constituent of Council of Scientific and Industrial Research (CSIR) is engaged in carrying out research and development projects on design, construction and maintenance of roads and runways, traffic and transportation planning of mega and medium cities, management of roads in different terrains, improvement of marginal materials, utilization of industrial waste in road construction, landslide control, ground improvements environmental pollution, road traffic safety and analysis & design, wind, fatigue, corrosion studies, performance monitoring/evaluation, service life assessment and rehabilitation of highway and railway bridges.

The institute provides technical and consultancy services to various user organizations in India and abroad. For capacity building of human resources in the area of highway Engineering to undertake and execute roads and runway projects, Institute has the competence to organize National and International Training Programmes continuing education courses since 1962 to disseminate the R&D finding to the masses.

Departments

List of departments in Central Road Research Institute (CRRI) is as follows:
 Planning, Monitoring and Evaluation 
 Transport Planning and Environment
 Bridge Engineering and Structures
 Geotechnical Engineering
 Traffic Engineering and Safety
 Pavement Evaluation
 Quality Management 
 Rigid Pavement 
 Flexible Pavement 
 Information, Liaison & Training

List of Directors
The list of Directors of Central Road Research Institute (CRRI) is as follows:

References

External links
 of the CRRI
CSIR Website

Council of Scientific and Industrial Research
Research institutes in Delhi
Ministry of Road Transport and Highways
Transport research organizations
Road transport organizations
Transport organisations based in India
Research institutes established in 1950
1950 establishments in India